The men's eight competition at the 1972 Summer Olympics in Munich took place from 27 August to 2 September at the Olympic Reggatta Course in Oberschleißheim. There were 15 boats (135 competitors) from 15 nations, with each nation limited to a single boat in the event. The event was won by New Zealand, the nation's first medal in the men's eight. Silver went to the United States. East Germany also earned its first medal in the event, with bronze.

Background

This was the 16th appearance of the event. Rowing had been on the programme in 1896 but was cancelled due to bad weather. The men's eight has been held every time that rowing has been contested, beginning in 1900.

An event that for decades had been almost entirely predictable had a competitive field in 1972. The United States had won this event at eight of the last ten Olympics, but only one of the last three (1964). West Germany was the defending Olympic champion (and, as part of the United Team of Germany, had won in 1960 as well). Argentina had won the 1971 Pan American Games. East Germany were the 1969 European Rowing Championships winners, 1970 World Rowing Championships winners, and 1971 European Rowing Championships runners-up. The Soviet Union had reached the podium at the 1969 European, 1970 World, and 1971 European events. New Zealand's eight had, in identical composition, won the 1971 European Rowing Championships.

Austria made its debut in the event. The United States made its 14th appearance, most among nations to that point.

Competition format

The "eight" event featured nine-person boats, with eight rowers and a coxswain. It was a sweep rowing event, with the rowers each having one oar (and thus each rowing on one side). This rowing competition consisted of three main rounds (quarterfinals, semifinals, and finals; up from two main rounds in prior Games), as well as a repechage round after the quarterfinals. The course used the 2000 metres distance that became the Olympic standard in 1912 (with the exception of 1948). Races were held in up to six lanes.

 Quarterfinals: Three heats with five boats each. The top three boats in each heat (9 total) advanced directly to the semifinals; the 4th and 5th place boats in each heat (6 boats) went to the repechage.
 Repechage: A single heat of six boats. The top three boats went to the semifinals, with the bottom three boats eliminated.
 Semifinals: Two heats with six boats each. The top three boats in each semifinal (6 boats total) went to the "A" final, while the bottom three boats in each went to the "B" final (out of medal contention).
 Finals: The "A" final consisted of the top six boats, competing for the medals and 4th through 6th place. The "B" final had the next six boats; they competed for 7th through 12th place.

Schedule

All times are Central European Time (UTC+1)

Results

Quarterfinals

The top three of each heat qualified to the semifinal round, while the remainder went to the repechage.

Quarterfinal 1

Quarterfinal 2

Quarterfinal 3

Repechage

The top three finishers advanced to the semifinal round and the other teams were eliminated.

Semifinals

The top three finishers qualified for Final A, with the remainder going to Final B.

Semifinal 1

Semifinal 2

Finals

Final B

Final A

References

External links
 Official reports of the 1972 Summer Olympics

Rowing at the 1972 Summer Olympics